The 2002–03 Bangladeshi cricket season featured the inaugural Test series in Bangladesh between Bangladesh and West Indies.  It was followed by Bangladesh's first home series against South Africa.

International tours

West Indian cricket team in Bangladesh

The West Indies played two Test matches and three limited overs internationals. They won both the Test matches and two of the One Day Internationals, while the remaining ODI was a no result.

South African cricket team in Bangladesh

South Africa played 2 Test matches against Bangladesh and took part in a limited overs tri-series with Bangladesh and India.  South Africa won the Test series against Bangladesh, winning both matches convincingly by an innings. The final of the tri-series resulted with the abandonment of the match after the first innings.

Domestic competitions

Honours

National Cricket League

Play-off

Final

National Cricket One Day League

Final

Other matches

See also
 History of cricket in Bangladesh

References

2002 in Bangladeshi cricket
2003 in Bangladeshi cricket
Bangladeshi cricket seasons from 2000–01
Domestic cricket competitions in 2002–03